Lieutenant Henry Edwin Barnes FZS (1848–1896) was born in Oxford and educated at Oxford University School. He worked in the Army stationed at Aden, Afghanistan and India. He wrote a Handbook to the Birds of the Bombay Presidency in 1885 and notes on birds at various places.

Publications

 Barnes, H. E. (1886). "Birds' nesting in Rajpootana". Journal of the Bombay Natural History Society. 1 (2): 38–62.
 ——— (1886). "Birds' nesting in Rajpootana". J. Bombay Nat. Hist. Soc. 1 (2): 308–362.
 ——— (1886). "Note on the breeding of Parra indica". J. Bombay Nat. Hist. Soc. 1 (4): 221–222.
 ——— (1887). "The two Shamas". J. Bombay Nat. Hist. Soc. 2 (1): 56.
 ——— (1887). "Notes on Ploceus philippinus". J. Bombay Nat. Hist. Soc. 2 (2): 105–107.
 ——— (1887). "Note on the irregular breeding of Grus antigone, the Sarus". J. Bombay Nat. Hist. Soc. 2 (2): 149–150.
 ——— (1892). "Note on the black-tailed rock-chat". J. Bombay Nat. Hist. Soc. 7 (2): 252–253.
 ——— (1891). "Nesting in western India". J. Bombay Nat. Hist. Soc. 6 (1): 1–25.
 ——— (1891). "Nesting in western India". J. Bombay Nat. Hist. Soc. 6 (3): 285–317.
 ——— (1890). "Nesting in western India". J. Bombay Nat. Hist. Soc. 5 (1): 1–19.
 ——— (1890). "Nesting in western India". J. Bombay Nat. Hist. Soc. 5 (2): 97–116.
 ——— (1890). "Nesting in western India". J. Bombay Nat. Hist. Soc. 5 (4): 315–337.
 ——— (1889). "Nesting in western India". J. Bombay Nat. Hist. Soc. 4 (1): 1–21.
 ——— (1888). "Nesting of Indian hirundines". J. Bombay Nat. Hist. Soc. 3 (1): 43–48.
 ——— (1888). "Nesting in western India". J. Bombay Nat. Hist. Soc. 3 (4): 205–224.
 ——— (1887). "Notes on the breeding of the Kentish Ringed Plover (Aegialitis cantianus) within Indian limits". J. Bombay Nat. Hist. Soc. 2 (3): 167–169.
 ——— (1889). "Nesting in western India". J. Bombay Nat. Hist. Soc. 4 (2): 83–97.
 ——— (1891). "Nesting in western India". J. Bombay Nat. Hist. Soc. 6 (2): 129–153.
 ——— (1889). "Nesting in western India". J. Bombay Nat. Hist. Soc. 4 (4): 237–255.
 ——— (1880). "Notes on the nidification of certain species in the neighbourhood of Chaman, S. Afghanistan". Stray Feathers. 9 (1, 2 & 3): 212–220.
 ——— (1881). "A list of birds observed in the neighbourhood of Chaman, S. Afghanistan". Stray Feathers. 9 (5 & 6) 449–460.
 ——— (1885). Handbook to the Birds of the Bombay Presidency. The Calcutta Central Press.
 Swinhoe, C. & Barnes, H. (1885). "On the birds of Central India - Part II". Ibis. 5 3 (10): 124–138.
 Swinhoe, C. & Barnes, H. (1885). "On the birds of Central India - Part I". Ibis. 5 3 (9): 52–69.
 Barnes, H. E. (1881). "Letters to the Editor". Stray Feathers. 10 (1, 2 & 3) 166–167.
 ——— (1897). The Birds of India: A Guide to Indian Ornithology. 1981 Reprint ed. 2 vols. Cosmo Publications, New Delhi.

References
 "Obituary". (1896). Ibis. 162
 Warr, F. E. (1996). Manuscripts and Drawings in the Ornithology and Rothschild Libraries of the Natural History Museum at Tring. British Ornithologists' Club.

External links
 Barnes, H. Edwin (1885). Handbook to the Birds of the Bombay Presidency.

English naturalists
Fellows of the Zoological Society of London
1848 births
1896 deaths